Dayananda Bajracharya was a Nepalese professor, biologist, and science writer. He got his master's degree from India and Ph.D. from Freiburg University, Germany. He was the vice chancellor of Nepal Academy of Science and Technology from 1998 to 2006.

In honor of Dr. Bajracharya, Nepal Academy of Science and Technology (NAST) has established Prof. Dr. Dayananda Bajracharya Research Award.

Awards and honors 

 1967: Mahendra Vidyabhusan Gold Medal, Class II
 1976: Mahendra Vidyabhusan Gold Medal, Class I
 1999: Prasiddha Prabal Gorkha Dakshin Bahu

References

1945 births
2013 deaths
Academic staff of Nepal Academy of Science and Technology
People from Kathmandu
University of Freiburg alumni
Tri-Chandra College alumni